Simon Henry Parson (born 23 May 1966) is a British anatomist. He is Regius Professor of Anatomy at the University of Aberdeen.

Parson was educated at Durham University (BSc Zoology, 1987) and the University of Edinburgh (PhD Neuroscience, 1990). He has been President of the Anatomical Society since 2019.

References

1966 births
Living people
Alumni of Durham University
Alumni of the University of Leeds
Alumni of the University of Edinburgh
British anatomists